Gérald Forschelet (born 19 September 1981 in Papeete, Tahiti) is a Tahitian-French professional football player who plays as defensive midfielder.

Career

Cannes

Forschelet started his career at Cannes on 1998, debuting for the team on 17 February 2001 in a Ligue 2 match against Montpellier. He played in other 6 matches in that season when the club was relegated to Championnat National. Playing at the 3rd tier of French football, Forschelet caught the attention of English club Bolton Wanderers and signed for the Premier League team in February 2002.

Bolton Wanderers

Forschelet never managed to get first team football at Bolton Wanderers after facing competition with players like Kevin Nolan, Per Frandsen, Iván Campo and Jay-Jay Okocha. Playing only for the reserve team during the whole 2002–03 season, the Tahitian left the club on loan for the whole 2003–04 season.

Neuchâtel Xamax

Arriving at Neuchâtel Xamax on loan, Forschelet managed to break into the first team with 24 appearances and 6 goals at Axpo Super League being used as right-midfielder and even as an attacking midfield. Upon his return, he was released from Bolton Wanderers and signed for French club FC Istres. Having limited play time due to injuries, Forschelet grabbed only two Ligue 1 appearances against Nantes and Lille before being released and returning to Neuchâtel Xamax where injuries once again hit the Tahitian midfielder who played the 90 minutes in only one of his 11 appearances.

Charleroi

Forschelet was transferred to Belgian Charleroi on 2005, after the club has finished 5th on 2004-05 Belgian First Division. He played 14 times for the Zèbres, scoring once.

Assyriska

In January 2007, Forschelet moved to Assyriska, which was recently relegated to Division 1, the 3rd tier of Swedish football, winning the competition the same year. However, his contract was not renewed after the club's promotion.

AFC Tubize

Forschelet signed on mid-2008 for AFC Tubize to play at the Belgian First Division. Forschelet appearance 16 times during AFC Tubize's first and only season at the top flight but could not avoid relegation. The Tahitian midfielder was released after the end of his contract.

Non-professional football

Forschelet had unsuccessful trials with Swedish clubs Åtvidabergs FF and Ljungskile SK before signing with Belgian low tier Cité Sport.

References

1981 births
Living people
French Polynesian footballers
French footballers
French Polynesian expatriate footballers
Bolton Wanderers F.C. players
A.F.C. Tubize players
FC Istres players
Neuchâtel Xamax FCS players
R. Charleroi S.C. players
AS Cannes players
Association football midfielders